Arena of Stars is a 45,000 square feet musical amphitheater in Genting Highlands, Pahang, Malaysia, built in 1998. The hall has a capacity of about 6,000 seats. It is also known for its famous World and National lion dance and dragon dance competitions. Singers and groups that have performed at Arena of Stars include Deep Purple, Boyz II Men, Michael Learns to Rock, Cliff Richard, Lionel Richie, Guang Liang, Jolin Tsai, Cyndi Wang, Rainie Yang, Angela Zhang, Olivia Newton-John, S.H.E, Joey Yung, Stefanie Sun, Vanness Wu, Wang Leehom, G.E.M, and Twins.

History
During its initial development, the amphitheater was built without a roof. However, due to the severe weather of Genting Highlands it was later decided that a roof was required. The first show at the amphitheater in January 1998 featured Sally Yeh and George Lam. The 2007 Zee Cine Award show was held at the amphitheater, necessitating an upgrade to the venue's make-up rooms.

In 2002, the amphitheater hosted the 3rd IIFA Awards, which honour artistic and technical excellence of professionals in Bollywood.

Technical parameters
All of the events in Arena of Stars are managed by the Promotions and Entertainment Department of Genting Highlands Resort.

The amphitheater's sound system was upgraded in July 2011 at a cost of US$3 million, including new speakers for the entire amphitheater. Seating in the amphitheater is divided into five categories according to cost, with white as the most expensive followed by red, green, yellow and blue.

See also
 List of concert hall in Malaysia

References

External links

Website

Music venues in Malaysia
Genting Highlands
1998 establishments in Malaysia